{{DISPLAYTITLE:(33001) 1997 CU29}}

, also written as (33001) 1997 CU29 is a cold classical Kuiper belt object, or cubewano. It has a perihelion (closest approach to the Sun) at 41.6 AU and an aphelion (farthest approach from the Sun) of 45.1 AU.  is about 280 km in diameter. It was discovered on February 6, 1997, by David C. Jewitt, Jane X. Luu, Chad Trujillo, and Jun Chen at the Mauna Kea Observatory, Hawaii.

References

External links 
 
 

033001
Discoveries by David C. Jewitt
Discoveries by Jane Luu
Discoveries by Chad Trujillo
Discoveries by Jun Chen (astronomer)
19970206